Lee Williams (born 3 February 1973) is an English former footballer who played in the Football League for Aston Villa, Shrewsbury Town, Peterborough United, Mansfield Town and Cheltenham Town.

References

English footballers
English Football League players
1973 births
Living people
Aston Villa F.C. players
Shrewsbury Town F.C. players
Peterborough United F.C. players
Shamrock Rovers F.C. players
Mansfield Town F.C. players
Cheltenham Town F.C. players
Telford United F.C. players
Association football midfielders
League of Ireland players
Expatriate association footballers in the Republic of Ireland
English expatriate footballers